The Kress Building at 1109 Broadway in Lubbock, Texas was built in 1932 as a S. H. Kress & Co. store building.  It was listed on the National Register of Historic Places in 1992.

It is a Mission/Spanish Revival-style influenced building designed by Edward F. Sibbert.  It was a S.H. Kress Company store until 1975.

See also

National Register of Historic Places listings in Lubbock County, Texas

References

Commercial buildings on the National Register of Historic Places in Texas
Mission Revival architecture in Texas
Commercial buildings completed in 1932
National Register of Historic Places in Lubbock, Texas
S. H. Kress & Co.
Retail buildings in Texas